Olim Kamalov, Tajik artist, was born on 3 May 1960 in Dushanbe, Tajikistan.

Early life

Kamalov was born into the family of Tajik composer Azam Kamalov and librarian, Fotima Kamalova.

Education

Attended Art College named after M. Olimov, Tajikistan, 1979.
Institute of Design and Fine Arts, Tajikistan, 2014

Work experience

By learning the specific of miniature painting and restoring copies of miniatures of Middle Age Persian artist Kamaleddin Behzad, Kamalov creates the series of his own works of modern miniature. He elaborated his own technology and paints miniatures on paper, canvas, wood and metal. In 2009 Olim Kamalov found Tajik school of miniature painting. Since then, his part in reviving miniature art in Tajikistan has been vital.

Of special interest are his original paintings depicting various episodes of everyday life in contemporary Tajikistan, both in towns and in rural areas. His rustic scenes are particularly curious as they have all the features of the traditional and rather generic decorative illustration programme of medieval miniature painting but present a number of very truthful details of real peasant life in Tajik villages, celebrating their feasts, like weddings, New year (navruz), a paradisiacal revival of blossoming nature in spring, or thematic scenes, like kite runners, an old man talking to a young girl by a mountainous stream, a loving couple under a blossoming tree wearing contemporary Tajik national dress. Kamalov’s successful attempt to connect through his works in such ways, Persian and Indian past with Tajik present, traditional crafts and high art, is his main contribution to modern Tajik visual culture.

Awards

Received medal of honored artist of the Republic of Tajikistan in 2009.

Professional memberships

Member of the Union of Artists of Tajikistan since 2003.

Personal art exhibitions

2004, 2009 – Swiss Cooperation Office in Tajikistan.

2005 – Soros Foundation, Gallery of Union of Artists of Tajikistan.

2006 – Turkish Embassy, Tajikistan.

2008 – Kamalov's gallery.

2009 – Indian Embassy, Tajikistan.

International Group Art exhibitions

Day of National Reconciliation in Tajikistan ( Dushanbe, Gallery of Union of artists of Tajikistan, 2002, 2007)

Day of culture of Tajikistan in Russian Federation (Moscow, Dushanbe, 2005)

Day of culture of Tajikistan in France ( Paris, 2005)

Day of culture of Tajikistan in Belarus (Minsk, 2008)

Day of culture of Tajikistan in India (Delhi, 2008)

References

External links 
 http://www.olimkamalov.com
 Magazine "Ogonyek" http://www.ogoniok.com/archive/2001/4680-3/81-90-91/
 Rai Gallery http://www.rai-gallery.tj/index.php?lng=en&id=68&PHPSESSID=0b188faa4f2d4301e3674e2b51aab741
 Art gallery "Naison" http://www.naison.tj/IZOBR_ISSK/ARTGAL/artgal.shtml
 TV "Mir" http://mirtv.ru/content/view/19598
 Positive news http://newsoffice.ru/archives/570
 http://globein.com/users/olim-kamalov

Living people
Year of birth missing (living people)